Gordon "Specs" Powell (June 5, 1922 – September 15, 2007) was a jazz drummer who began performing in the swing era.

Career

Specs was the first black staff musician hired by CBS in 1943. Born in New York City, he started on piano but became exclusively a drummer in the late 1930s. He worked with Edgar Hayes (1939), Benny Carter (1941–42), and Ben Webster. He played percussion on the Ed Sullivan Show in the  early 1960s and remained active professionally until the 1970s. At some point in the early 1960s he approached the Latin percussion maker Martin Cohen and had Cohen make for him an early (perhaps the first) bongo stand. In 2004 he was inducted into the Big Band Jazz Hall of Fame.

Powell was also a photographer, and his photographic archives of 2500 images are preserved in the Tom and Ethel Bradley Center at California State University, Northridge.

He died in San Diego of kidney disease at the age of 85.

Discography

As leader
 Movin' in (Roulette, 1957)
 Specs Powell Presents Big Band Jazz (Strand, 1961)

As sideman
 Billy Butler, Guitar Soul! (Prestige, 1969)
 Charlie Byrd, The Great Byrd (Columbia, 1968)
 Erroll Garner, The Most Happy Piano (Columbia, 1957)
 Errol Garner, Encores in Hi Fi (Columbia, 1958)
 Charlie Kennedy & Charlie Ventura, Crazy Rhythms (Regent, 1957)
 Moondog, Moondog 2 (Columbia, 1971)
 Rose Murphy, Jazz, Joy, and Happiness (United Artists, 1962)
 Red Norvo, Gene Krupa, Charlie Ventura, Teddy Wilson, Jazz Concert (Jazztone, 1956)
 Oscar Peterson, The Oscar Peterson Trio and the Gerry Mulligan Quartet at Newport (Verve, 1963)
 Bernard Purdie, Soul Is... Pretty Purdie (Flying Dutchman, 1972)
 Chuck Rainey, The Chuck Rainey Coalition (Skye, 1972)
 Ray Repp, Hear the Cryin (Myrrh, 1972)
 Lightnin' Rod, Hustlers Convention (Celluloid, 1973)
 Shirley Scott, Soul Song (Atlantic, 1969)
 Charlie Shavers, The Complete Charlie Shavers with Maxine Sullivan (Bethlehem, 1957)
 Nina Simone, Nina Simone Sings the Blues (RCA Victor, 1967)
 Nina Simone, To Love Somebody (RCA Victor, 1969)
 Bert Sommer, The Road to Travel (Capitol, 1969)
 Bert Sommer, Inside (Eleuthera, 1970)
 Carla Thomas, Memphis Queen (Stax, 1969)
 Joe Thomas, Joy of Cookin' (Groove Merchant, 1972)
 Charlie Ventura, Jumping with Ventura (EmArcy, 1955)
 Charlie Ventura, East of Suez (Regent, 1958)
 Reuben Wilson, Set Us Free (Blue Note, 1971)
 Teddy Wilson, Teddy Wilson All Star Jazz Sextette (Allegro, 1956)
 Teddy Wilson, The Teddy Wilson Trio & Gerry Mulligan Quartet with Bob Brookmeyer at Newport (Verve, 1957)

References

External links
Scott Yanow All-Music Guide
LP music
Specs Powell obituary''
Specs Powell NAMM Oral History Program Interview (2000)
Peggy Powell Interview NAMM Oral History Library (2021)

1922 births
2007 deaths
American jazz drummers
Bebop drummers
Hard bop drummers
Musicians from New York City
Swing drummers
20th-century American drummers
American male drummers
Jazz musicians from New York (state)
20th-century American male musicians
American male jazz musicians